The Brandenburg police is the German Landespolizei force for the German state of Brandenburg.

Organisation 

Under the Police Headquarters there are four regional headquarters (North, East, South, West), as well as the State Office of Criminal Investigation and the Directorate of Special Services. The four police directorates report to 16 police inspectorates, 9 water police stations and 5 motorway police stations. The 16 police inspectorates are divided into the headquarters of the police inspectorate and a further 33 police stations.

The police headquarters is headed by Hans-Jürgen Mörke as police president.

References

State law enforcement agencies of Germany
Organisations based in Potsdam